You Should Be Mine may refer to:

"You Should Be Mine (Don't Waste Your Time)", a 1997 song by Brian McKnight
"You Should Be Mine (The Woo Woo Song)", a 1986 song by Jeffrey Osborne

See also
You Could Be Mine